Frank Andersson Castañeda Vélez (born 17 July 1994) is a Colombian professional footballer who plays as a winger or a forward for Ekstraklasa club Radomiak Radom.

Club career

FK Senica
Castañeda made his professional Fortuna liga debut for Senica against Železiarne Podbrezová on 3 March 2018, in a 1–0 home win.

Sheriff Tiraspol
On 30 December 2019, Sheriff Tiraspol announced that they had an agreement to sign Castañeda, with the deal being completed on 20 January 2020.

Warta Poznań
On 11 February 2022, having already agreed to join Thai side Buriram United from 1 July 2022, Castañeda moved to Polish Ekstraklasa side Warta Poznań, signing a short-term deal until the end of June.

Career statistics

Club

References

External links
 Futbalnet profile
 FK Senica official club profile
 

1994 births
Living people
Colombian footballers
Colombian expatriate footballers
Association football forwards
Caracas FC players
Orsomarso S.C. footballers
FK Senica players
FC Sheriff Tiraspol players
Warta Poznań players
Frank Castaneda
Radomiak Radom players
Categoría Primera B players
Slovak Super Liga players
Moldovan Super Liga players
Ekstraklasa players
Frank Castaneda
Expatriate footballers in Slovakia
Expatriate footballers in Moldova
Expatriate footballers in Poland
Expatriate footballers in Thailand
Colombian expatriate sportspeople in Slovakia
Colombian expatriate sportspeople in Moldova
Colombian expatriate sportspeople in Poland
Colombian expatriate sportspeople in Thailand
Footballers from Cali